Vanity Fair is a 1946 play by the British writer Constance Cox, based on William Makepeace Thackeray's novel of the same name.

It premiered at the Q Theatre before transferring to the Comedy Theatre in London's West End where it ran for 70 performances between 29 October and 21 December 1946. A studio production of this play was broadcast live on BBC television on 3 September 1950 and again on 7 September, starring Belle Chrystall.

References

Bibliography
 Kabatchnik, Amnon. Blood on the Stage, 1950-1975: Milestone Plays of Crime, Mystery, and Detection. Scarecrow Press, 2011.
 Wearing, J.P. The London Stage 1940-1949: A Calendar of Productions, Performers, and Personnel.  Rowman & Littlefield, 2014.

1946 plays
West End plays
Plays set in the 19th century
Plays set in London
Plays by Constance Cox
Plays based on novels